Cyclothone acclinidens, commonly known as the benttooth bristlemouth, is a species of ray-finned fish in the genus Cyclothone. It is found in the Atlantic, Pacific, and Indian Oceans.

References 

Gonostomatidae
Fish described in 1899